The women's 100 metres event at the 2002 Asian Athletics Championships was held in Colombo, Sri Lanka on 9–10 August.

Medalists

Results

Heats

Final
Wind: +1.3 m/s

References

2002 Asian Athletics Championships
100 metres at the Asian Athletics Championships
2002 in women's athletics